Min of the Desert is a modern working copy of an ancient Egyptian ship of Hatshepsut's time, built for the BBC documentary The Pharaoh Who Conquered the Sea. It was named after the Egyptian fertility god Min.

References

Replica ships